The International Journal of Damage Mechanics is a peer-reviewed scientific journal covering the fields of engineering and materials science. The editor-in-chief is Chi L. Chow (University of Michigan). It was established in 1992 and is published by SAGE Publications.

Abstracting and indexing 
The journal is abstracted and indexed in Academic Search Premier, Current Contents, the Material Science Citation Index, Mechanical Engineering Abstracts, Scopus, and the Science Citation Index Expanded. According to the Journal Citation Reports, its 2019 impact factor is 3.125 (2 years), ranking it 126 out of 314 journals in the category "Materials Science, Multidisciplinary" and 31st out of 136 journals in the category "Mechanics".

References

External links 
 

SAGE Publishing academic journals
English-language journals
Publications established in 1992
Engineering journals